The Charlottetown Festival is a seasonal Canadian musical theatre festival which runs from late May to mid-October every year since 1965.

Named after its host city Charlottetown, Prince Edward Island and its Charlottetown Conference, since its inception in 1965 the festival has showcased Canada's longest-running musical, Anne of Green Gables – The Musical, as well as having sought out and commissioned more than 100 new Canadian musicals. Some highlights include Evangeline, Emily, Johnny Belinda, Stories From The Red Dirt Road, On The Road With Ditch Mason, Tell Tale Harbour,  Bittergirl--The Musical, and Kronborg--The Hamlet Rock Musical, which was the first Canadian musical to play on Broadway.

Anne of Green Gables – The Musical debuted in 1965 and holds the Guinness World Record for longest-running annual musical, being performed every summer since except for 2020, due to the pandemic & 2021. The production has been performed more than 2,700 times in Charlottetown, and has also toured to Japan, New York, and across Canada.

The Charlottetown Festival – "a Festival of Music and Laughter" – was created in the spirit of the 1864 meetings of the Fathers of Confederation whose deliberations were highlighted by numerous gala balls, social events and one of the few circuses to visit the Island in that era.

Hosted in Confederation Centre of the Arts, every year, The Charlottetown Festival features some of Canada's finest performers, designers, playwrights, composers, and directors in a showcase of musical theatre and comedy. The Centre includes an 1,100-seat theatre, a national art gallery, arts education programs, and various cabaret theatres.

The Festival includes a summer musical theatre training program called the "Confederation Centre Young Company." The Young Company shows are freely available to the public and take place at noon outside Confederation Centre. The shows typically feature Canadian-themed content. In 2011 Indigenous playwright Cathy Elliott wrote and directed "The Talking Stick" featuring an all-Indigenous cast. A piece from the play was performed for the Duke and Duchess of Cambridge during their tour of PEI in 2011.
As a Canada 150 Signature Project, the Young Company toured from coast to coast to coast in 2017, presenting the original musical The Dream Catchers and working with youth in each city. This same musical, which carried a strong theme of Truth and Reconciliation, was performed for Prime Minister Justin Trudeau in October 2017, during Confederation Centre's presentation of the annual Symons Medal and Lecture in Charlottetown.

Past Artistic Directors of the Festival include Mavor Moore, Alan Lund, Jacques Lemay, Duncan MacIntosh, Anne Allan, and Walter Learning. The current artistic director is Adam Brazier.

See also
List of festivals in Prince Edward Island
List of music festivals in Canada

References

External links
 

Music festivals established in 1965
Music festivals in Charlottetown
1965 establishments in Canada
Theatre festivals in Prince Edward Island